The Perennial Philosophy is a comparative study of mysticism by the British writer and novelist Aldous Huxley. Its title derives from the theological tradition of perennial philosophy.

Social and political context

The Perennial Philosophy was first published in 1945 immediately after the Second World War by Harper & Brothers in the United States (1946 by Chatto & Windus in the United Kingdom). The jacket text of the British first edition explains:

The book offers readers, who are assumed to be familiar with the Christian religion and the Bible, a fresh approach employing Eastern and Western mysticism:

The final paragraph of the jacket text states:

Scope of the book

In the words of poet and anthologist John Robert Colombo:

Style of the book

Huxley deliberately chose less well-known quotations because "familiarity with traditionally hallowed writings tends to breed, not indeed contempt, but ... a kind of reverential insensibility, ... an inward deafness to the meaning of the sacred words." So, for example, Chapter 5 on "Charity" takes just one quotation from the Bible, combining it with less familiar sources:

"He that loveth not knoweth not God, for God is love."1 John iv

"By love may He be gotten and holden, but by thought never."The Cloud of Unknowing

"The astrolabe of the mysteries of God is love."Jalal-uddin Rumi"

Huxley then explains: "We can only love what we know, and we can never know completely what we do not love. Love is a mode of knowledge ..."

Huxley is quite vague with his references: "No specific sources are given."

Structure of the book

The book's structure consists of:

 A brief Introduction by Huxley, of just over 5 pages.
 Twenty-seven chapters (each of about 10 pages) of quotations from sages and saints on specific topics, with "short connecting commentaries." The chapters are not grouped in any way though there is a kind of order from the nature of the Ground at the beginning, down to practical exercises at the end. The Acknowledgements list 27 books from which quotations have been taken. The chapter titles are:

 That Art Thou
 The Nature of the Ground
 Personality, Sanctity, Divine Incarnation
 God in the World
 Charity
 Mortification, Non-Attachment, Right Livelihood
 Truth
 Religion and Temperament
 Self-Knowledge
 Grace and Free Will
 Good and Evil
 Time and Eternity
 Salvation, Deliverance, Enlightenment
 Immortality and Survival
 Silence
 Prayer
 Suffering
 Faith
 God is not mocked
 Tantum religio potuit suadere malorum ("The practice of religion leads people to practice evil.")
 Idolatry
 Emotionalism
 The Miraculous
 Ritual, Symbol, Sacrament
 Spiritual Exercises
 Perseverance and Regularity
 Contemplation, Action, and Social Utility

 A detailed Bibliography of just over 6 pages.
 A detailed Index (two columns of small print,  pages).

Critical reception

In the United States
The Perennial Philosophy was widely reviewed when first published in 1945, with articles appearing in Book Week, Booklist, The Christian Century, Bull VA Kirkus' Bookshop Serv., The Nation, The New Republic, The New Yorker, Saturday Review of Literature, Springfield Republican, New York Herald Tribune, and the Wilson Bulletin.

The New York Times wrote that, "Perhaps Mr. Huxley, in The Perennial Philosophy has, at this time, written the most needed book in the world." The Times described the book as an:

The Times also stated that, "It is important to say that even an agnostic, even a behaviorist-materialist ... can read this book with joy. It is the masterpiece of all anthologies."

Similarly, forty years later Huston Smith, a religious scholar, wrote that, in The Perennial Philosophy:

Not all the reception was so positive. Chad Walsh, writing in the Journal of Bible and Religion in 1948, spoke of Huxley's distinguished family background, only to continue:

In the United Kingdom
In the United Kingdom, reviewers admired the comprehensiveness of Huxley's survey but questioned his other-worldliness and were hostile to his belief in the paranormal.

C. E. M. Joad wrote in New Statesman and Society that, although the book was a mine of learning and Huxley's commentary was profound, readers would be surprised to find that he had adopted a series of peculiar beliefs such as the curative power of relics and spiritual presences incarnated in sacramental objects. Joad pointed out that, if the argument of the book is correct, only those who have undergone the religious experiences upon which it is based are properly able to assess its worth. Further, he found that the book was dogmatic and intolerant, "in which pretty well everything we want to do is wrong." Finally, Joad asserted that Huxley's mistake was in his "intellectual whole-hoggery" and that he was led by ideas untempered by ordinary human experience.

In the journal Philosophy, the Anglican priest Rev. W. R. Inge remarked on the book's well chosen quotations and called it "probably the most important treatise we have had on mysticism for many years." He saw it as evidence that Huxley was now a mystical philosopher, which he regarded as an encouraging sign. Inge pointed out conflicts between religions and within religion and agreed that a rapprochement must be through mystical religion. However, he wondered if the book, with its transcendence of the personality and detachment from worldly concerns, might not be more Buddhist than Christian. He concluded his review by calling into question Huxley's belief in psychical phenomena.

Elsewhere

Canadian author John Robert Colombo wrote that as a young man he, like many others in the 1950s, was swept away with enthusiasm for "the coveted volume" :

{{blockquote|Everyone interested in consciousness studies has heard of his study called The Perennial Philosophy. It bears such a prescient and memorable title. His use of the title has preempted its use by any other author, neuropsychologist, Traditionalist, or enthusiast for the New Age. The book so nobly named did much to romanticise the notion of "perennialism" and to cast into the shade such long-established timid Christian notions of “ecumenicism” (Protestants dialoguing with Catholics, etc.) or "inter-faith" meetings (Christians encountering non-Christians, etc.). Who would care about the beliefs of Baptists when one could care about the practices of Tibetans?}}

Colombo also stated that:

Huxley's view of perennial philosophy

Huxley's Introduction to The Perennial Philosophy begins:

In the next paragraph, Huxley summarises the problem more succinctly, saying: "Knowledge is a function of being." In other words, if you are not suited to knowing something, you do not know it. This makes knowing the Ground of All Being difficult, in Huxley's view. Therefore, he concludes his Introduction with:

See also
 Perennial philosophy (philosophia perennis)
 The Teachings of the Mystics – A book by Walter T. Stace with a similar thesis

Notes

References

Publication dataThe Perennial Philosophy'', 1945, Harper & Brothers
Harper Perennial 1990 edition: 
Harper Modern Classics 2004 edition: 
Audio Scholar 1995 audio cassette edition:

External links 
The Perennial Philosophy at Internet Archive.

1945 non-fiction books
Books by Aldous Huxley
Philosophy of religion literature
Mysticism texts
Chatto & Windus books
Harper & Brothers books
Religious pluralism
Neo-Vedanta